The Markham City Council is the governing body of the city of Markham, Ontario, Canada. It consists of the mayor, eight councillors who each represent one of the city's eight wards, and four regional councillors who, along with the mayor, are elected via double direct election to represent the city at York Regional Council.

Council meets at the chambers at the Markham Civic Centre at the corner of Warden Avenue and Highway 7.

The most recent municipal election was held in 2022.

History
Markham Village was incorporated as a township in 1850, establishing a council with one reeve, one deputy reeve, and three councillors. This system was used until 1 January 1971, when municipalities in York County were reorganized into the Regional Municipality of York, and Markham was newly incorporated as a town when Markham Village merged with Unionville and Thornhill east of Yonge Street. An electoral system based on six wards was established, and this numeric ward system remains mostly unchanged since its creation. Two wards were added, one in 1976 (Ward 7), and another in 1984 (Ward 8).

Minor boundary changes have taken place (1978, 1982, 1997 and 2006) with no impact of the numbering.

Most ward changes require approval by the Ontario Municipal Board (in the case of 1976 and 1997) with only the 2006 changes not requiring prior approval.

Changes were made to the boundaries for all 8 wards for 2014 elections with Thornhill assigned to Ward 1 to replace the former Ward 1 and 2 split.

The changes also take into consideration existing neighbourhoods, natural boundaries, better representation by population, effective representation and accommodation for future growth of Markham.

Then still under town status, the mayor, town councillors and regional councillors were elected by the residents of Markham every 3 years until 2006. Provincial legislation extended the election period to 4 years.

Town Council 2006-2010

Regional Councillors

Regional councillor represent the city at York Regional Council. By default the mayor is also a member of Regional Council as well.

Town Council (2010-2012) and City Council 2012-2014

The council elected in the 2010 municipal election took office on December 1, 2010. The town council members became city council members on July 1, 2012 when Markham changed from a town to a city.

Regional Councillors

Regional councillor represent the city at York Regional Council. By default the mayor is also a member of Regional Council as well.

City Council (2014-2018)

The council elected in the 2014 municipal election took office on December 1, 2014. Wards boundaries were changed with former Ward 1 and 2 combined as one (with portions moved to other wards), former Ward 6 became Ward 2.

Regional Councillors

Regional councillor represent the city at York Regional Council. By default the mayor is also a member of Regional Council as well.

City Council (2018-2022)
The following councillors were elected in the 2018 municipal election.

Regional Councillors

Regional councillor represents the city at York Regional Council. By default the mayor is also a member of Regional Council as well.

City Council (2022-present)
The following councillors were elected in the 2022 municipal election.

Regional Councillors

Regional councillor represents the city at York Regional Council. By default the mayor is also a member of Regional Council as well.

Vacancies

City council vacancies are filled by a by-election, as in the case in 2009 when then Ward 3 councillor Joseph Virgilio resigned to become Regional Councillor and Don Hamilton elected as the new Ward 3 councillor.

Prior to the Ward 3 by-election Joseph Virgilio was appointed to fill the vacancy left by the death of Regional Councillor Tony Wong.

Committees
Committees are created and chair and represented by city councillors to deal with issues and by-laws that impact the city. The chair and vice-chairs are elected selected by the mayor.

STANDING COMMITTEES
 Development Services Committee
 General Committee
 Committee of the Whole

OTHER COMMITTEES
 Cornell Hub
 Langstaff Implementation
 Licensing
 Parking Advisory
 Environmental Issues
 Thornhill
 Toronto Liaison
 Green Print Steering
 Public Realm Advisory
 Storm Water Management Liaison
 School Board Liaison
 Seniors Hall of Fame Awards
 Stiver Mill Preservation

ADVISORY COMMITTEES
 Committee of Adjustment
 Heritage Markham Committee
 Achievement & Civic Recognition Awards (ACRA)
 Agricultural Advisory Committee
 Pandemic Readiness Emergency Plan (PREP) Steering
 Public Art Advisory
 Seniors' Hall of Fame Awards
 Environmental Advisory
 Race Relations
 Advisory Committee on Accessibility
 Animal Care
 Environmental Issues
 Cycling & Pedestrian Advisory

SUB-COMMITTEES
 Communications Committee and Information Technology
 Budget
 Licensing
 Milliken Mills
 Parking Advisory
 Southeast Community Centre & Library Design

References

 City of Markham

Politics of Markham, Ontario
Municipal councils in Ontario